My Date with a Vampire is a 1998 Hong Kong television series produced by Asia Television (ATV). The story is based on the future events of the plot of Vampire Expert, a similar two-season television drama aired on ATV in 1995 and 1996. It blends aspects of the "hopping" corpses of jiangshi fiction with those of western vampires, along with elements of Chinese mythology and modern horror legends. The series is a tribute to Lam Ching-ying, the lead actor of Vampire Expert and a prominent cast member of the Mr. Vampire franchise, who died of liver cancer in 1997. It was followed by My Date with a Vampire II (2000) and My Date with a Vampire III (2004).

Plot 
Fong Kwok-wah was a Chinese guerrilla fighter during the Second Sino-Japanese War. In 1938, he was duelling with Yamamoto Kazuo, a major of the Imperial Japanese Army, when they were interrupted by Cheung-San, the progenitor of all vampires. The two men and Fuk-sang, a boy who was hiding nearby, were bitten by Cheung-San and they became vampires.

In the present-day (1998), Fong has changed his name to Fong Tin-yau and now lives in Hong Kong, where he works as a policeman. Fuk-sang lives with him, pretends to be his son, and attends primary school. During this time, Fong meets Ma Siu-ling, the heiress to a clan of sorcerers dedicated to ridding the world of evil supernatural beings. He gradually becomes embroiled in a love triangle with her and Wong Jan-jan, her close friend and confidante.

Meanwhile, Yamamoto has become the influential boss of a big company in Hong Kong and has a small group of vampire followers under his command. Planning to turn every human into a vampire, Yamamoto unleashes his minions to attack people and spread the "vampire gene". Chaos break out in Hong Kong as vampires multiply and roam the streets freely. Fong teams up with Ma and their allies to stop Yamamoto and manage to destroy him. However, a sorcerer called Rahu later resurrects Yamamoto and controls him to do his bidding, preparing to carry out a ritual during a blood moon to dominate the universe. Once again, Fong, Ma and their allies combine forces to confront Rahu and put an end to his evil plan.

Cast 
 Eric Wan as Fong Tin-yau / Fong Kwok-wah, the protagonist. Originally a guerrilla fighter during the Second Sino-Japanese War, he was bitten by Cheung-San during a duel with Yamamoto and has become a vampire.
 Joey Meng as Ma Siu-ling, the heiress to a clan of sorcerers dedicated to ridding the world of evil supernatural beings. She meets Fong and starts a romance with him.
 Joey Meng also portrayed Ma Dan-na, Ma Siu-ling's grandaunt and predecessor.
 Kristy Yang as Wong Jan-jan, Ma Siu-ling's close friend and confidante who works as a teacher. She falls in love with Fong after they first meet in Japan. After she is mortally wounded, Fong bites her to save her life by turning her into a vampire.
 Kristy Yang also portrayed Yamamoto Yuki, Yamamoto's wife and Mirai's mother.
 Kenneth Chan as Yamamoto Kazuo, the primary antagonist. Originally a major of the Imperial Japanese Army, he was bitten by Cheung-San during a duel with Fong and has become a vampire. In the present-day (1998), he has become the influential boss of a big company in Hong Kong and has a group of vampire followers under his command.
 Chapman To as Kam Ching-chung, a confidence trickster who becomes Ma's apprentice later and learns how to be a real sorcerer. He is an incarnation of Xu Xian, the White Snake's lover in the Legend of the White Snake.
 Pinky Cheung as Yamamoto Mirai, Yamamoto's daughter and Domoto's lover. She holds a grudge against her father for biting her and turning her into a vampire, and becomes one of Fong and Ma's allies.
 Berg Ng as Ken / Domoto Shingo, Mirai's lover and Yamamoto's right-hand man. He became a vampire after Mirai bit him instinctively when she first turned into a vampire. He secretly hates Yamamoto and plots to destroy his boss.
 Cheung Kwok-kuen as Fuk-sang, a boy vampire who lives with Fong and pretends to be his son. Years ago, he was caught up in the duel between Fong and Yamamoto and ended up being bitten by Cheung-San, and has become a vampire since then.
 Wong Shee-tong as Ho Ying-kau, a sorcerer and ally of Ma and Fong. He is also the successor of Mo Siu-fong, the protagonist in Vampire Expert.
 Kam San as Cheung-San, the progenitor of all vampires who bit Fong, Yamamoto and Fuk-sang.
 Sin Ho-ying as Master Peacock, a Japanese Buddhist monk from Mount Kōya.
 Ching Tung as Lo Hoi-ping, a tailor who lives with his mother in Ka-Ka Building.
 Chan Lai-wan as Lo Hoi-ping's mother
 Mak King-ting as Pak So-so / Pak So-ching, the White Snake in the Legend of the White Snake.
 Wong Mei-fan as Siu-ching, the Green Snake, the White Snake's companion.
 Keung Ho-man as Ko Bo, Fong's colleague in the police force.
 Chung Yeung as Peter, a Catholic priest and Ma's friend.
 Lisa Lui as Au-yeung Ka-ka, Wong Jan-jan's mother and the owner of Ka-Ka Building.
 Lau Kwok-shing as Kam Shau-cheng, Kam Ching-chung's father.
 Ng Wan-yee as Kam Ching-chung's mother
 Wai Lit as Yu-meng Sap-sam / Rahu, an evil sorcerer from ancient times.
 Alice Chan as Miu-sin, the incarnation of the bodhisattva Guanyin.
 Raymond Tsang as Lau Hoi, Fong Tin-yau and Ko Bo's boss in the police force.
 Yeung Ka-nok as Lam Kwok-tung, the executive director of Yamamoto's company.
 Leung Bik-tze as Bik-ka, a vampire with psychic powers serving under Yamamoto.
 Lee Yung as Herman, a vampire working as a model in Yamamoto's company.
 Lau Shek-yin as Vairocana, the omnipotent divine being.

Vampires 
The vampires depicted in the My Date with a Vampire trilogy incorporate elements from the Chinese jiangshi and the western vampire. They are beings that do not belong to the Trailokya or any of the Six Paths in Buddhist cosmology. They do not age and need to regularly feed on blood to sustain themselves. They may also possess powers such as superhuman speed or the ability to shapeshift, in addition to their immortal status. Their powers and invulnerability to sunlight, religious symbols and other things that typical vampires fear, however, become weaker as the generation gap between them and Cheung-San (the progenitor of all vampires) increases. An example to illustrate this concept of "generation" is as follows: Person A, who became a vampire after being bitten by Cheung-San himself, is known as a second-generation vampire. Person B, who became a vampire after being bitten by Person A or another direct victim of Cheung-San, is a third-generation vampire, and so on.

At the end of the second season, it is revealed that Pangu, the creator of the universe in Chinese mythology, is not a single entity, but a clan of divine beings who are all first-generation vampires. Unlike others, these vampires do not need to feed on blood to survive. It is hinted that Cheung-San is a member of the Pangu clan. In the third season, two important Chinese mythological figures, Fuxi and Yaochi Shengmu, are first-generation vampires.

Starting in the second season, a vampire's generation or type can be identified by his/her eye colour when he/she goes into "vampire mode".

Production 
The script for My Date with a Vampire was written by Leung Lap-yan in 1997. Leung attempted to market the script to Television Broadcasts Limited (TVB) but was rejected, so he went to Asia Television (ATV) instead. Chan Sap-sam, who wrote the script for the two sequels, revealed that Lam Ching-ying, a prominent cast member in the Mr. Vampire franchise, was their original choice for the lead actor, and that Joey Meng did not have a place in their initial cast list. However, after they finalised the script, they were unable to contact Lam, who was critically ill. Besides, ATV's top management was not pleased with the script because they felt that it did not fit people's impressions of how vampires should be like. ATV's top management wanted to cancel the project after Lam died of liver cancer in 1997. Faced with these problems, Chan decided to make bold changes to the script and create a new character – Ma Siu-ling, a female ghostbuster wearing high heels and a miniskirt who is greedy for money. Sin Chi-wai, the producer for the series, recommended Joey Meng to play Ma Siu-ling. When Eric Wan was offered to play the male lead character in the series, he wanted to turn down the offer because he felt exhausted, but eventually agreed as he became more interested in the story.

Future development 
According to Netease Report, Fox Networks Group will remake the series. Cora Yim, the head of Fox Networks Group Asia, claimed that one-third of ATV's inventory had been acquired by Fox Networks Group, including 28 television series; My Date with a Vampire is one of the 28.

See also 
 Vampire film
 List of vampire television series

References

External links 
  My Date with a Vampire official page on ATV's website

1998 Hong Kong television series debuts
Asia Television original programming
Vampires in television
Romantic fantasy television series
Jiangshi fiction
Works based on the Legend of the White Snake